Jalan Masai Lama (Johor state route J10) is a major road in Johor, Malaysia. It is also a main route to Plentong, Masai, Pasir Gudang and Kong Kong.

List of interchanges

Roads in Johor